Ľubomír "Ľuboš" Reiter (born 3 December 1974) is a former Slovak football striker and manager of MŠK Tesla Stropkov.

Reiter played for Tatran Prešov (1996–99) and MŠK Žilina (1999–2002) in his native Slovakia and then for Sigma Olomouc (2001–05) and Slavia Prague (2007) in the Czech Republic. He scored 15 goals in the 2003-04 season, finishing among the Czech league's top scorers. In 2005, he came to Major League Soccer and the Chicago Fire. However, his season with the Fire was a disappointment, as he only scored three goals and left MLS to go back to his native Slovakia.

At the time of his signing by the Fire, Reiter was a current Slovak international, a rarity for European players in MLS. He had been capped 25 times for his country, scoring eight goals. Reiter was a regular during Slovakia's 2006 World Cup qualification campaign.

References

External links 
 
 
 

1974 births
Living people
Slovak footballers
Slovakia international footballers
Slovak football managers
Czech First League players
SK Sigma Olomouc players
SK Slavia Prague players
MŠK Žilina players
Chicago Fire FC players
Slovak Super Liga players
People from Stropkov
Sportspeople from the Prešov Region
Expatriate footballers in the Czech Republic
Major League Soccer players
Association football forwards